{{DISPLAYTITLE:Kappa2 Coronae Australis}}

Kappa2 Coronae Australis (Kappa2 CrA), Latinized from κ2 Coronae Australis, is the primary of a probable binary system located in the southern constellation  Corona Australis. It is visible to the naked eye as a bluish-white hued star with an apparent visual magnitude of 5.59. The distance to this star is roughly 710 light years based on Gaia DR3 parallax measurements. At its current distance, Kappa2 CrA's brightness is diminished by 0.45 magnitudes due to interstellar dust.

This is an ordinary B-type main-sequence star with a stellar classification of B9Vnn, with the nn meaning extremely nebulous absorption lines, usually due to rapid rotation. It has 3.12 times the mass of the Sun and a radius 5.28 times larger than the Sun, which is large for stars of this type. The large radius combined with the high luminosity of the star may indicate that Kappa2 CrA is highly evolved.

Kappa2 CrA forms a binary star with Kappa1 Coronae Australis, also known as HR 6952. Kappa1 is located 20.5" away along a position angle of 359°. The two were once thought to be an optical pair due to the large difference in their parallaxes but are now considered to be physical based on Gaia measurements. The satellite places Kappa1 and Kappa2 around 700 light years away.

References

External links
Alcyone.de 
 Alcyone.de 
Simbad.u-strasbg.fr
Simbad.u-strasbg.fr
Server7.wikisky.org
Server7.wikisky.org

Corona Australis, Kappa2
Corona Australis
Corona Australis, Kappa2
CD-38 12895
170868
090968
6953
Coronae Australis, 17